The 2021 New York City mayoral election was held on November 2, 2021. Incumbent Mayor Bill de Blasio was term-limited and ineligible to run for re-election.

On June 22, 2021, the primary elections for the Democratic and Republican primaries were held. The 2021 primaries were the first New York City mayoral election primaries to use ranked-choice voting rather than the plurality voting of previous primaries. On election night, Guardian Angels founder and radio talk show host Curtis Sliwa won the Republican primary with 67.9% of the vote, defeating New York State Federation of Taxi Drivers founder Fernando Mateo. Brooklyn Borough President and former police officer Eric Adams had a lead on election night in the Democratic primary but did not reach 50% of the vote, meaning that ranked-choice voting would come into play. In the final round of tabulation of the ranked-choice vote in the Democratic primary, Adams defeated former New York City Department of Sanitation Commissioner Kathryn Garcia, 50.4%–49.6%.

In the general election, Adams handily defeated Sliwa with 67.0% of the vote to become the 110th mayor of New York City and the city's second black mayor, after David Dinkins.

History
In 2019, New York City voters passed Ballot Question #1 to amend the City Charter to "give voters the choice of ranking up to five candidates in primary and special elections for mayor, public advocate, comptroller, borough president, and city council beginning in January 2021". The first election in the city to use ranked-choice voting was in the 24th council district in Queens, which took place on February 2, 2021. This was the first time ranked-choice voting was used in the New York City mayoral election.

In 2019, journalists and political commentators predicted several potential 2021 mayoral candidates, including Brooklyn Borough President Eric Adams, Bronx Borough President Rubén Díaz Jr., NYC Council Speaker Corey Johnson, NYC Comptroller Scott Stringer, and NYC Public Advocate Jumaane Williams.

Incumbent Mayor of New York City Bill de Blasio was barred by term limits from seeking a third term.

By May 2021, thirteen candidates had qualified for the Democratic Party primary, and two for the Republican Party primary. There are also minor party and independent campaigns for the general election in November.

Democratic primary

Polling in late January and early February 2021 showed businessman Andrew Yang as the Democratic primary frontrunner, with Adams in second place and Stringer in third place. 
 
In April, Scott Stringer was accused of sexual abuse by Jean Kim. Stringer denied the allegations, claiming that the relationship had been consensual. In June, a second woman accused him of sexual misconduct.

On May 5, 2021, Politico reported that a recent poll found that Eric Adams was leading the Democratic primary contest; this marked the first time since January that any Democratic candidate other than Yang had led in a public poll. On June 7, Spectrum News reported that Adams had maintained a lead in the Democratic primary.

On July 6, the Associated Press reported that Adams had won the Democratic primary. The Guardian stated that Adams, a "former police captain", had prevailed "after appealing to the political center and promising to strike the right balance between fighting crime and ending racial injustice in policing". An earlier report from The New York Times asserted that Adams had run as a "working-class underdog" and had "hammered away at the message that he was the only candidate who could tackle both crime and police reform".

Candidates

Nominee
Eric Adams, Brooklyn Borough President, former NY State Senator from the 20th district (2007–2013), former NYPD captain

Eliminated in primary
Art Chang, former JPMorgan Chase managing director, founder of NYC Votes
Shaun Donovan, former Director of the US Office of Management and Budget (2014–2017), United States Secretary of Housing and Urban Development (2009–2014), former Commissioner of the NYC Department of Housing Preservation and Development (2004–2008)
Aaron Foldenauer, attorney
Kathryn Garcia, former Commissioner of the NYC Department of Sanitation (2014–2020), former Interim Chair and CEO of the NYC Housing Authority (2019), former Chief Operating Officer of the NYC Department of Environmental Protection (2012–2014)
Ray McGuire, former Citigroup executive
Dianne Morales, former social services non-profit CEO, former schoolteacher
Paperboy Love Prince, Brooklyn rapper
Scott Stringer, New York City Comptroller, former Manhattan Borough President (2006–2013), former assemblymember for the 67th district (1993–2005)
Joycelyn Taylor, CEO of TaylorMade Contracting
Maya Wiley, The New School professor, former chair of the New York City Civilian Complaint Review Board (2016-2017), former counsel to Bill de Blasio, former ACLU and NAACP Legal Defense Fund attorney
Isaac Wright Jr., lawyer
Andrew Yang, candidate for President of the United States in 2020, former Presidential Ambassador for Global Entrepreneurship (2015-2017), founder of Venture for America

Write-in candidates who did not qualify for ballot access
 Nickie Kane, web designer, entrepreneur and paralegal student at City University of New York
 Eddie Cullen, tech entrepreneur and professor at Purdue University
Thomas Downs, restaurant worker
Guiddalia Emilien, real estate agent and small business owner
Garry Guerrier, paramedic and nurse
Max Kaplan, director of social media at Talent Resources
Barbara Kavovit, CEO of Evergreen Construction and former Real Housewives of New York City cast member
Ira Seidman, data scientist
Ahsan Syed, candidate for NYC Mayor in 2017

Withdrawn candidates
Michael DeName, former independent US presidential candidate
Rubén Díaz Jr., Bronx Borough President (2009present), former NY State Assemblymember (19972009) (endorsed Eric Adams)
Quanda S. Francis, president of Sykes Capital Management (withdrew to run as an independent)
Zach Iscol, entrepreneur, United States Marine Corps veteran (running for NYC Comptroller; lost election)
Corey Johnson, Speaker of the NYC Council (2018present), NYC Councilmember for the 3rd district (2014present) (running for NYC Comptroller)
Carlos Menchaca, NYC Councilmember for Brooklyn's 38th district (2013–present) (endorsed Andrew Yang)
Julia Qing Reaves, LGBT+ activist
Stephen Bishop Seely, actor
Loree Sutton, former Commissioner of the NYC Department of Veterans' Services (20172019), former US Army brigadier general (endorsed Kathryn Garcia)

Declined
Andy Byford, former president of the NYC Transit Authority (20182020)
Melinda Katz, Queens County District Attorney (2020present), Queens Borough President (20142020), NYC Councilmember for the 29th district (20022009), NY State Assemblymember for the 28th district (19941999)
Melissa Mark-Viverito, former NYC Council Speaker (20142017)
Alexandria Ocasio-Cortez, US Representative for New York's 14th congressional district (2019present) (endorsed Maya Wiley)
Christine Quinn, former NYC Council Speaker (20062013)
Max Rose, former US Representative for New York's 11th congressional district (20192021) (formed exploratory committee but did not run)
Ritchie Torres, US Representative for New York's 15th congressional district (2021present) (endorsed Andrew Yang)
Jumaane Williams, NYC Public Advocate (2019present), former NYC Councilmember for the 45th district (20102019) (running for re-election as NYC Public Advocate) (endorsed Maya Wiley)
Jeff Zucker, chairman of Warner Media News & Sports (2019present)

Results by round

Republican primary

Candidates

Major candidates

The following candidates appeared on the Republican primary ballot.

Sliwa ran on a platform opposing the Defund the Police movement, supporting a property tax overhaul so that wealthy citizens pay more in comparison to working-class residents, keeping in place the Specialized High School Admissions Test while increasing opportunities for vocational training in charter schools, and focusing on fiscal restraint. He also opposes the killing of unwanted animals and supports making all animal shelters no-kill shelters.

Failed to qualify for ballot access
Abbey Laurel-Smith, businesswoman
Adam Oremland, attorney and social media personality
Bill Pepitone, retired NYPD officer (ran as the candidate for the Conservative Party)
Sara Tirschwell, CFO of Foundation House

Withdrawn
Cleopatra Fitzgerald, activist
Christopher Scott Krietchman, entrepreneur

Declined
Nicole Gelinas, fellow at the Manhattan Institute
Andrew Giuliani, son of Rudy Giuliani, former special assistant to the president, former associate director of the White House Office of Public Engagement (running for governor in 2022)
Randy Levine, president of the New York Yankees
Kelly Kennedy Mack, president of Corcoran Sunshine Marketing Group
Scherie Murray, businessperson, candidate for NY State Assembly in 2015, candidate for NY District 14
David B. Samadi, urologist
Eric Ulrich, NYC Councilmember (2009present)

Endorsements

Opinion polling

Polling key and sponsors

Debates

Results

Third parties

Conservative Party

Nominee
Bill Pepitone, retired NYPD officer

Working Families Party

Candidate
No candidate nominated

Declined
Deborah Axt, former director of Make the Road New York
Maya Wiley, The New School professor

Empowerment Party

Nominee 
Quanda S. Francis, Sykes Capital Management President and Accountant

Libertarian Party

Nominee 
Stacey Prussman, activist and comedian

Party for Socialism and Liberation

Candidate
Cathy Rojas, teacher and socialist activist

Independents

Declared
Thomas Downs, activist
Quanda Francis, president of Sykes Capital Management
Christopher Scott Krietchman

General election

Debates

Endorsements

Polling

Polling key and sponsors

Results

Though Adams won the election easily in the heavily Democratic city, he received fewer votes than Bill de Blasio in either of his two mayoral runs, and lost many heavily Asian American precincts. This is partly attributed to Sliwa's pledge to halt the construction of homeless shelters which were proposed by Adams to be built in neighborhoods such as Asian-majority Sunset Park. Other issues of importance to Asian American activist leaders included proposed reforms to the Specialized High Schools Admissions Test in high schools, bail reform, and plans to build new jails in neighborhoods such as Chinatown, Manhattan.

See also
2021 New York City Public Advocate election
2021 New York City Comptroller election
2021 New York City Council election
2021 New York City borough president elections
List of mayors of New York City

References

External links

New York City
2021
New York City
Eric Adams